Kees or KEES may refer to:

 Kees (given name)
 Kees (surname)
 KEES, an American AM radio station licensed to Gladewater, Texas

See also
 Cees (disambiguation)